Good to Be Back is a 2013 Iranian comedy-drama film directed by Dariush Mehrjui.

Plot 
Dentist Farzad (Hamed Behdad) has returned to Iran after many years abroad to escape his anxieties and daily stresses. Farzad is delighted to be reunited with his old friend, Kambiz (Reza Attaran), who has been his seaside neighbor for years. Upon his arrival in the Iran, a mysterious quasi-space object appears and causes Dr. Yasmin and her magic stones to enter Farzad's life, which threatens Farzad and Kambiz long friendship.

Cast 
 Hamed Behdad
 Mahnaz Afshar
 Reza Attaran
 Alireza Jafari
 Homayoun Ershadi
 Roya Teymourian
 Hasan Pourshirazi
 Mohammad Kart
 Ali Asghar Tabasi
 Razieh Faraji

References

External links

2013 films
2010s Persian-language films
2013 comedy-drama films
Iranian comedy-drama films
Films directed by Dariush Mehrjui